Isoleucyl-tRNA synthetase, cytoplasmic is an enzyme that in humans is encoded by the IARS1 gene.

Aminoacyl-tRNA synthetases catalyze the aminoacylation of tRNA by their cognate amino acid. Because of their central role in linking amino acids with nucleotide triplets contained in tRNAS, aminoacyl-tRNA synthetases are thought to be among the first proteins that appeared in evolution. Isoleucine-tRNA synthetase belongs to the class-I aminoacyl-tRNA synthetase family and has been identified as a target of autoantibodies in the autoimmune disease polymyositis/dermatomyositis. Two alternatively spliced variants have been isolated that represent alternate 5' UTRs.

Interactions
IARS has been shown to interact with EPRS.

References

Further reading